Vdovichenko is a Ukrainian surname. Notable people with the surname include:

Nikolay Vdovichenko (born 1989), Ukrainian footballer
Valentin Vdovichenko (1928–2003), Soviet Russian fencer

See also
 

Ukrainian-language surnames